Bruno Savry (born 11 March 1974 in Avignon) is a French former professional football defender.

External links
  
 
 

Living people
1974 births
Sportspeople from Avignon
Association football defenders
French footballers
Ligue 1 players
Louhans-Cuiseaux FC players
FC Istres players
SC Toulon players
SO Cassis Carnoux players
French expatriate footballers
Expatriate footballers in Costa Rica
Footballers from Provence-Alpes-Côte d'Azur